Crossotus subocellatus is a species of beetle in the family Cerambycidae. It was described by Fairmaire in 1886. It is known from Djibouti, Algeria, Chad, Senegal, Eritrea, Kenya, Egypt, Libya, Mali, Mauritania, Saudi Arabia, Ethiopia, Morocco, Oman, Niger, Nigeria, Somalia, Tunisia, Sudan, and the Western Sahara. It feeds on Acacia tortilis.

References

subocellatus
Beetles described in 1886